The Orion 27 is an American sailboat that was designed by Henry Mohrschladt as a cruiser and first built in 1979.

The Orion 27 design was developed into the Orion 27-2 in 1981.

Production
The design was built by Pacific Seacraft in the United States, from 1979 until 1981, but it is now out of production.

Design
The Orion 27 is a recreational keelboat, built predominantly of fiberglass, with the decks having a plywood core, with wood trim. It has a masthead sloop, cutter rig or yawl rig, a raked stem with a bowsprit, an angled transom, an internally mounted spade-type rudder controlled by a wheel and a fixed long keel. It displaces  and carries  of lead ballast.

There are two interior arrangements, designated "A" and "C". Both have sleeping accommodation for five people, with a double "V"-berth in the bow cabin and an aft cabin with a single berth on the port side. The "A" has a drop-down "U"-shaped dinette, while the "C" has a two bench dinette table, which allows a bigger head with a shower. The galley is located on the starboard side, just forward of the companionway ladder. The galley is equipped with a two-burner stove and a double sink.

Operational history
The boat is supported by an active class club, the Pacific Seacraft Orion 27 Club.

Operational history
A review in Blue Water Boats, described the design as, "beautiful, strong, and capable". The review went on to say, "unsurprisingly for a Mohrschladt design, the Orion 27 has conservative lines. Under the waterline is a long keel with a forefoot cutaway to improve nimbleness and reduce wetted area. The sections carry the tried and true wine-glass shape. Don’t expect record setting pace with this kind of shape; think strong, safe, and good manners for heaving-to in the rough."

See also
List of sailing boat types

References

Keelboats
1970s sailboat type designs
Sailing yachts
Sailboat type designs by Henry Mohrschladt
Sailboat types built by Pacific Seacraft